RC-28 or Kanniakoil-Bahour Road branches out from NH-45A at Kanniakoil and ends at Bahour.

References

External links
 Official website of Public Works Department, Puducherry UT

State highways in Puducherry
Transport in Puducherry